John Walker Soccer Complex is a soccer-specific stadium located in Lubbock, Texas, United States on the campus of Texas Tech University.  It has been home to the Texas Tech Red Raiders women's soccer team since 2008.

The John Walker Soccer Complex is the only soccer pitch in the Big 12 Conference equipped with FieldTurf, a mix of synthetic blades of grass supported by an infill of sand and rubber.

The stadium is named after John Walker after he, his wife, Lisa, and their family contributed $2.25 million toward the project, earning the naming rights.

Amenities
The John Walker Soccer Complex, or "The Walker," includes a soccer house outfitted with team locker rooms, athletic training facilities, coaches' offices, coaches' lounge, the Red Raider lounge (a public lounge), a team lounge equipped with a state-of-the art video system for film study, a team weight room and an Under Armour equipment room. Players also have a "boot room" located immediately inside the facility as a place dedicated to their footwear.

In 2012, a 37,800 sq ft climate-controlled indoor soccer facility was added to The Walker adjacent the main field. The indoor facility, named the Gerald Myers Indoor Soccer Facility, allows the Red Raiders their own space to practice indoors in any weather condition.

Events 
NCAA Division I Women's Soccer Tournament First Round: 2012, 2013, 2014, 2016, 2018, 2019

Record 

Since the 2008 season, the Walker has had a 74.58% winning percentage for the Red Raiders with the best season coming in 2013 when they went 10-1-0.

References

External links
 

Soccer venues in Texas
Texas Tech Red Raiders women's soccer venues
College soccer venues in the United States
Sports venues in Lubbock, Texas
2008 establishments in Texas
Sports venues completed in 2008